Snow Peak is a snow-covered peak rising to 428 m in western Livingston Island in the South Shetland Islands, Antarctica. It is linked by a saddle to Casanovas Peak in the west, and surmounts Berkovitsa Glacier to the northwest, Fletcher Nunatak and Belev Nunatak to the northeast,  Tundzha Glacier to the east and Verila Glacier to the southwest.

The feature was charted and named descriptively by Discovery Investigations personnel in 1935.

Location

Maps
 L.L. Ivanov et al. Antarctica: Livingston Island and Greenwich Island, South Shetland Islands. Scale 1:100000 topographic map. Sofia: Antarctic Place-names Commission of Bulgaria, 2005.
 L.L. Ivanov. Antarctica: Livingston Island and Greenwich, Robert, Snow and Smith Islands. Scale 1:120000 topographic map.  Troyan: Manfred Wörner Foundation, 2009.

References
 SCAR Composite Antarctic Gazetteer.

Mountains of Livingston Island